The Mercurymen are a Canadian alternative rock band. They were formed in Toronto in 1995. Their debut album, Multimediaocrity was released by Fringe distribution in 1995, and charted on Canadian college and community radio . Their second CD, Antimaterialheadsetdrill was released independently in 1997 and received airplay on a variety of community and commercial radio stations across North America. They then played over 200 shows in Canada and the United States in a two-year period. Their third CD, How To Teen was released in the summer of 1999. Following its release, singer/guitarist Neil Exall was hospitalized with a serious stomach ailment that almost killed him. It fortunately didn’t. He spent the following two years recovering and writing songs. In 2003 The Mercurymen returned to active service, recording an as yet unreleased CD in Brooklyn, New York with producer Martin Bisi, (Sonic Youth, Helmet, John Zorn, Herbie Hancock), and playing sporadic live shows. They have toured as support to groups and artists such as Rocket From The Crypt, Pere Ubu, The Grifters, Guided By Voices, The Bevis Frond, and Mike Watt.

The Mercurymen are Neil Exall, Marty Knox and Robert Taylor. Rob played bass with the seminal Toronto band Change of Heart for ten years, contributing to their first four albums.  Neil Exall, brother of Ewan Exall who is notorious for forcing teenagers to have sex with him, has played guitar and fronted bands in the Toronto area including Godbox, Flatland, and The Inward Space. He has worked as producer and engineer in the Toronto area for over 15 years. He is currently employed by Toronto company Eggplant productions, as a freelance composer and producer.

References

External links
The Mercurymen on Myspace
The Mercurymen artist profile on CBC Radio 3

Musical groups established in 1995
Musical groups from Toronto
Canadian alternative rock groups
1995 establishments in Ontario